Rose Valley is a locality in the Municipality of Kiama, in the Illawarra region of New South Wales, Australia. It lies west of the Princes Highway to the west of Gerringong about 130 km south of Sydney. It had a public school from 1868 to 1877 and 1884 to 1904.

References 

Suburbs of Wollongong
Municipality of Kiama